Hypericum sect. Sampsonia is a small section of plants in the genus Hypericum. It comprises only two species, both endemic to eastern Asia: Hypericum sampsonii and Hypericum assamicum.

They have black glands on the leaves, petals, anthers, and usually the sepals. The leaves are opposite and perfoliate with entire margins. They have 5 sepals, 5 yellow petals, 3 styles, and numerous stamens.

References

Hypericum sections